Jesson is a surname. Notable people with the surname include:

 Ben Jesson (born 1988), British sport shooter
 Bradley D. Jesson (1932–2016), Chief Justice of the Arkansas Supreme Court
 Bruce Jesson (1944–1999), New Zealand left wing journalist, author and political figure
 Cecil Jesson (1899–1961), member of the Queensland Legislative Assembly
 Cornelius "Charles" Jesson (1862–1926), British trade unionist and MP
 Paul Jesson (born 1946), British actor
 Ralph William Jesson (1893–1985), US football coach
 Robert Jesson (1886-1917), cricketer and Army Officer
 Thomas Touchet-Jesson, 23rd Baron Audley (1913–1963), English peer
 Vivian Jesson (1893–1957), known as Vivian Rich, silent film actress. Wife of Ralph W. Jesson
 William Jesson (1580-1651), English dyer, mayor and MP

See also 
 Jesson's Church of England Primary School, Dudley, UK
 Laura Jesson, Leading female role in Still Life (play) and Brief Encounter (film)

External links
 Jesson family website